Thomas Alden Page (May 24, 1967 – March 3, 2017) was an American singer-songwriter, best known for his 1990 hit single "I'll Be Your Everything" and was later a music industry executive. Page collaborated with many artists, including Malaysian singers Amy Mastura and Fauziah Latiff.

Early life
Page was born in 1967 in Glen Ridge, New Jersey, to parents Fred and Miriam Page. He grew up in nearby West Caldwell. He graduated from James Caldwell High School in 1985.<ref>"James Caldwell alumni hold multi-class reunion", Lifestyles". Retrieved October 25, 2015. "Some of those in attendance were Caldwell Police Lt. Marc Driggs, Class of '86; Tommy Page, Class of '85 who is a pop star in the Music Industry with a former No. 1 hit, 'I'll be your everything,' as well as acting credits on shows including Full House;</ref> Page took a leave of absence from New York University's Stern School of Business when his music career began to take off. He returned to finish his remaining two years and graduated in 1997.

Career
In 1985, Tommy and his brother, Bill Page, formed a band called Broken Promises in New Jersey. They were signed to Broccoli Rabe Records and released a self-titled four-track EP. Tommy is credited as playing keyboards, piano, and performs backing vocals. A year later, to help support himself during his first year at Stern, Page worked as a cloakroom attendant in a popular New York nightclub called Nell's. The job gave Page a chance to play his demo tape to the house DJ, who then used the demos as part of his club mixes. The unknown sounds so impressed him that soon Page was introduced to Sire Records founder Seymour Stein. Shortly after, he was asked to write the theme tune of the film Shag and released it as his first single. Page's self-titled debut album was released by Sire/Warner Bros. Records in November 1988 and contained hits such as "A Zillion Kisses", "Turning Me On", "I Think I'm in Love", and "A Shoulder to Cry On".

The follow-up album Paintings in My Mind (which he dedicated to his grandmother) gave Page a No. 1 single in the U.S., "I'll Be Your Everything", a song that was written with and features members of New Kids on the Block. Other singles from the album that were released after that were "When I Dream of You" and "Turn on the Radio" (another New Kids on the Block collaboration). The album also features "Don't Give Up on Love", a duet with Latin freestyle singer Sa-Fire. Sa-Fire and Page co-wrote the song, which was released as a single overseas. Page's third album, released in 1991, was titled From the Heart, and his vocals there showcased a wider range with higher notes than previous efforts. On this album, the ballads were more orchestral. Tommy cited the songs in the album were inspired by the current music trend at the time of Wilson Phillips. The first single, "Whenever You Close Your Eyes", saw Page working with Michael Bolton and Diane Warren. "Under the Rainbow" and "Madly in Love" also were released as singles. Page also appeared on an episode of Full House, titled "Crushed", which first aired on January 14, 1992. In the episode, he sings a special song to Stephanie Tanner on her tenth birthday, but spends the following day with her sister DJ, much to Stephanie's dismay.

As an appreciation to his fans in Asia, Page released another album, A Friend to Rely On, in 1992. It contains a duet with Sally Yeh titled "I'm Always Dreaming of You" as well as a cover of Nik Kershaw's "Wouldn't It Be Good" and a song penned with Donna De Lory (best known as Madonna's backing singer) called "Heaven in Your Eyes". As house music was the current trend, the upbeat songs were produced in such form. In 1993, Page and Latin freestyle singer Sa-Fire teamed to create a house-music group called La Casa, also featuring Allan Edwards Tibbett and Dacia Palmer. Page and Sa-Fire wrote and produced three songs, "Show Me the Way", "Get to You" and "Dance to My Music" for the group. The songs appeared on New Faces, a house-music compilation on Sire/Warner Bros. Records.

Before releasing his next album Time in 1994, Page replaced Donny Osmond for three months in Andrew Lloyd Webber's Broadway musical Joseph and the Amazing Technicolor Dreamcoat. Page concentrated on releasing his following albums in Asia, especially after he signed with the Japanese label Pony Canyon Records. In 1995, he released his first compilation album, Greatest Hits: Dedicated to You. The same year, Page recorded a duet with Tiffany, "Close Our Eyes", for her album, All the Best. His next studio album, Loving You, was released in 1996, containing a duet with Amy Mastura titled "The Best Part" as well as a cover of John Waite's 1984 hit "Missing You". Ten 'Til Midnight, released in 2000, was only available for sale online. In 2003, Page released a DVD collection of his music videos, which was sold through his website. Page was one of the producers on Tennessee Girl's album Guilty Pleasures.

In 2011, after a successful stint as an executive at Warner Bros. Records, where he helped to shape the careers of Michael Bublé, Alanis Morissette, Josh Groban, and Green Day, among others, he joined Billboard magazine as publisher. As a publisher, he created new features such as the Industry Icon Award as well as the infamous Power 100 List. In April 2013, Page joined Pandora Internet Media as head of music partnerships. In 2015, Page released a single titled "I Break Down 2015", a slower version of his 1990 song of the same name. In June 2016, Page released an 18-track CD of his greatest ballads titled My Favorites, which included the 2015 single, "I Break Down 2015" (with vocals and instrumental version).

Personal life and death
Page died on March 3, 2017, of an apparent suicide. He is survived by his husband Charlie and their three children.

Discography
Studio albums

EPs

Compilation albums

Singles 

Soundtrack, guest, and compilation appearances

Videography
Music videos
"The Shag"
"A Zillion Kisses"
"A Shoulder to Cry on"
"Turning Me On"
"I'll Be Your Everything"
"Turn on the Radio"
"When I Dream of You"
"Whenever You Close Your Eyes"
"Madly in Love"
"Under the Rainbow"
"Heaven in Your Eyes"
"I'm Always Dreaming of You" (feat. Sally Yeh)
"Time"
"Places in My Heart"
"The Best Part (feat. Amy Mastura)"
"Missing You"
"I Break Down 2015"

Video albumsI'll Be Your Everything Videos (1990)Tommy Page: The Video Collection'' (2003)

References

External links
 
 
 
 

1967 births
2017 deaths
Age controversies 
2017 suicides
20th-century American singers
21st-century American singers
20th-century American male singers
21st-century American male singers
American freestyle musicians
James Caldwell High School alumni
People from Glen Ridge, New Jersey
People from West Caldwell, New Jersey
Singers from New Jersey
Sire Records artists
American LGBT singers
LGBT people from New Jersey